John William Considine III (born January 2, 1935) is an American writer and actor who wrote for, and made numerous appearances in, film and television from 1960 until 2007.

Biography

Early life
Considine was born in 1935 in Los Angeles to producer John Considine Jr. His grandfathers were two pioneering vaudeville impresarios, Alexander Pantages and namesake John Considine Sr. He's the older brother of actor, writer and photographer Tim Considine and the paternal nephew of the late political reporter and newspaper columnist Bob Considine.

Career
Among the many television series on which Considine has appeared as a guest star are Adventures in Paradise, Surfside Six, The Aquanauts,  Lock-Up, Sea Hunt, Ripcord, Combat!, Straightaway, My Favorite Martian, The Twilight Zone, The Outer Limits, Perry Mason, The F.B.I., Gomer Pyle, U.S.M.C., Marcus Welby, M.D., The Rockford Files, The Devlin Connection, The Eddie Capra Mysteries, Lou Grant, Mannix, Cannon, Taxi, Dynasty, Family, Eight is Enough, Hart to Hart, Remington Steele, Highway to Heaven, The Jeffersons, Hotel, MacGyver, Hardcastle & McCormick, The Colbys, Emerald Point N.A.S., Crazy Like a Fox, Knight Rider, The A-Team, Simon & Simon, Murder She Wrote, L.A. Law and Boston Legal.

His film career included roles in The Greatest Story Ever Told (1965), Doctor Death: Seeker of Souls (1973), The Thirsty Dead (1974), Buffalo Bill and the Indians, or Sitting Bull's History Lesson (1976), Welcome to L.A. (1976), The Late Show (1977), When Time Ran Out (1980), Circle of Power (1981), Endangered Species (1982), Choose Me (1984), Trouble in Mind (1985), Fat Man and Little Boy (1989), Coupe de Ville (1990), Free Willy 2: The Adventure Home (1995) and The Book of Stars (1999).

He wrote the original screenplay for – and also appeared in – the Robert Altman film A Wedding (1978), and has also had acting roles on several daytime soap operas including Bright Promise (as Dr. Brian Walsh, 1971–72); The Young and the Restless (as Phillip Chancellor II, 1973–74); and two stints as different characters on Another World (as Vic Hastings, 1974–76, and as Reginald Love, 1986–88).

Filmography

Film

Television

Bibliography 
Improvising: My Life and Show Business (S&L Enterprises, 2012).
A War: A Boy's Struggle To Survive World War II in Beverly Hills (CreateSpace, 2013).

Notes

External links

Living people
1935 births
American male soap opera actors
American male film actors
American male television actors
Male actors from Los Angeles
20th-century American male actors
Considine family